A' Ghlas-bhienn (918 m) is a mountain in the Northwest Highlands of Scotland. It lies in the Kintail area of Ross-shire, close to the settlement of Morvich.

A rocky peak, its ascent can be done in conjunction with the Falls of Glomach.

References

Mountains and hills of the Northwest Highlands
Marilyns of Scotland
Munros